The 1949 Cork Senior Hurling Championship was the 61st staging of the Cork Senior Hurling Championship since its establishment by the Cork County Board in 1887. The draw for the opening round fixtures was made at the Cork Convention on 30 January 1949. The championship began on 10 April 1949 and ended on 18 September 1949.

Glen Rovers were the defending champions.

On 18 September 1949, Glen Rovers won the championship following a 6-5 to 0-14 defeat of Imokilly in the final. This was their 12th championship title overall and their second title in succession.

Results

First round

Second round

Semi-finals

Final

Championship statistics

Miscellaneous

 Divisional side Imokilly qualified for the championship final for the first time ever.

References

Cork Senior Hurling Championship
Cork Senior Hurling Championship